The Botanic Garden of Smith College is located on the campus of Smith College, in Northampton, Massachusetts, United States. It consists of a fine selection of woody trees, shrubs, herbaceous plants, and an excellent collection of tropical and subtropical plants in The Lyman Conservatory (greenhouses in the Lyman Plant House). All are open to the public.

The first outlines of the Botanic Garden began in the 1880s, when Smith College hired the firm of Olmsted, Olmsted and Eliot to develop a campus landscape plan. Frederick Law Olmsted, senior member of the firm, is best remembered for designing Central Park in New York City and the Boston park system. The Olmsted plan dated February 1893 includes curving drives and walkways, open spaces with specimen trees, and vistas over Paradise Pond through wooded groves. Olmsted also provided planting lists of diverse trees, shrubs, herbs, and aquatic and marsh plants. However, in a more formal sense, the Botanic Garden of Smith College took shape under William Francis Ganong, appointed professor of botany and director of the Botanic Garden in May 1894, and Edward J. Canning, hired in summer 1894 as head gardener.

Smith's Botanic Garden collection includes 1200 types of woody trees and shrubs, 2200 types of hardy herbaceous plants, 3200 types of tender herbaceous and woody plants in greenhouses, and 6600 different kinds of plants, giving a total of approximately 10,000 types of plants on campus.

The Lyman Conservatory's greenhouses with  date from 1895, and house over 2500 species of plants for the instruction of Smith students in the plant sciences. These plants are selected from a wide variety of families and habitats; they comprise one of the best collections of tropical, subtropical, and desert plants in the country.

Other Smith Campus Gardens include the Rock Garden, Japanese Garden, Happy Chace '28 Garden, Capen Garden, Woodland Garden, and Systematics Garden & Perennial Border.

See also
List of botanical gardens in the United States

External links

Smith College
Smith College, The Botanic Garden of
Smith College
History of Hampshire County, Massachusetts
Protected areas of Hampshire County, Massachusetts
Greenhouses in Massachusetts